Raúl Leoni served as President of Venezuela from March 13, 1964, to March 11, 1969.

Background
In the elections of 1963 the Democratic Action (AD) candidate Raúl Leoni, a long-time ally of Rómulo Betancourt (President from 1959 to 1964) from the times of dictator Juan Vicente Gómez, won handily. Rafael Caldera of COPEI came second. The Wolfgang Larrazábal political phenomenon was eclipsed and Jóvito Villalba on his own came just behind Caldera. AD was still the pardo party by excellence, but Caracas was definitely lost.

Presidency

Raúl Leoni's presidency saw the construction of the Guri Dam, a power station with a combined installed capacity of 1750 megawatts (MW) that created a reservoir which is the largest fresh water body of water in Venezuela and one of the largest man-made blackwater lakes ever created.
Leoni's government was unexceptional, but it was Leoni who had to liquidate the remnants of the communist insurrection, for which he put the army in charge of the country with carte blanche to be as ruthless as it had to. But in fact it was the communist guerrilleros themselves who brought about their own liquidation. They had no rural support whatsoever. Unlike guerrillas all over the world, they did not control villages and lived from hand to mouth. They knew they were no match for the army and avoided confrontations. Castro had been hoping that Venezuela would be the second act of the Latin American revolution, and he tried to supply the Venezuelan guerrillas. This was in keeping with the theory of what could be called the "permanent agrarian revolution", which the French intellectual Régis Debray had expressed in the widely circulated book Revolution Inside the Revolution and Ernesto "Che" Guevara had been trying to carry out first in Africa and later, fatally for him, in Bolivia. Castro sent a trusted officer, Manuel Ochoa, to assess the Venezuelan guerrillas, and the report that he brought was negative, which effectively ended Cuba's intervention in Venezuelan affairs. By then the Venezuelan leftists had given up on violence and were seeking legalization, but Leoni did not offer it. Ochoa was later tried and executed by Castro on an unlikely charge of drug-smuggling.

Cabinet

References

See also
 History of Venezuela, 1958-1998

History of Venezuela
Leoni, Raúl